The 1868 Republican National Convention of the Republican Party of the United States was held in Crosby's Opera House, Chicago, Cook County, Illinois, on May 20 to May 21, 1868. Ulysses S. Grant won the election and became the 18th president of the united states.

Commanding General of the U.S. Army Ulysses S. Grant was the unanimous choice of the Republican convention delegates for president. For vice president the delegates chose Speaker Schuyler Colfax, who was Grant's choice. In Grant's acceptance telegram, a letter to then President of the Republican National Convention Joseph R. Hawley, Grant said "Let us have peace",  which captured the imagination of the American people.

Background 
Republicans, led by their Radical faction, had scored decisive victories in the 1866 elections. If that trend continued in the 1867 elections, then the party’s presidential nomination would likely go to a Radical like Chief Justice Salmon P. Chase or Senator Benjamin Wade. Chase had the support of important figures like Senator Charles Sumner and financier Jay Cooke. More moderate Republicans, such as Senator William P. Fessenden, Charles Francis Adams Jr., and The New York Times, had interpreted the 1866 elections not as a mandate for radicalism, but as a rejection of President Andrew Johnson’s programs and personality; therefore, they were wary of a Radical nominee.

The Grant candidacy, though, took on momentum in the wake of the state elections in 1867. The electorate rejected the Radical Republican agenda by voting for Democratic control in the key Northern states of New York, Pennsylvania, and Ohio, and by rejecting black manhood suffrage amendments in Kansas and Ohio. The election results bolstered the case of the moderate Republicans and seemed to close the door to a Radical nominee. Georges Clemenceau, a Paris Temps journalist who would later be the French premier, reported accurately that "The real victims of the victory of the Democrats are Mr. Wade and Mr. Chase."

Presidential nomination

Presidential candidates 

As Republicans convened in Chicago in May 1868, Grant had no serious opposition for the nomination; he was nominated unanimously on the first ballot.

Presidential Balloting / 2nd Day of Convention (May 21, 1868)

Vice Presidential nomination

Vice Presidential candidates 

Colfax was selected for vice president on the fifth ballot. Colfax was popular among Republicans for his friendly character, party loyalty, and Radical views on Reconstruction.

Vice Presidential Balloting / 2nd Day of Convention (May 21, 1868)

See also 
 1868 United States presidential election
 1868 Democratic National Convention
 History of the United States Republican Party
 List of Republican National Conventions
 U.S. presidential nomination convention

References 

 Presidential election, 1868.: Proceedings of the National union Republican convention, held at Chicago, May 20 and 21, 1868./ reported by Ely, Burnham & Bartlett, Chicago, official reporters of the convention.

External links 

 Republican Party Platform of 1868 at The American Presidency Project

1868 in Illinois
Political conventions in Chicago
Republican National Conventions
1868 United States presidential election
1868 conferences
May 1868 events